Gaujac is the name of several communes in the south of France:

 Gaujac, Gard
 Gaujac, Gers
 Gaujac, Lot-et-Garonne

See also
 Gaugeac, in the Dordogne department
 Gaujacq, in the Landes department